Major-General Basemah al-Shater is a Syrian army officer and Director of Medical Services in the Ministry of Interior.

References 

Syrian military doctors
Syrian generals
Female army generals